Chinary Ung (born November 24, 1942 in Takéo, Cambodia) is a composer currently living in California, United States.

Career
After arriving in the US in 1965 to study clarinet, he turned to composition studies with Chou Wen-chung and Mario Davidovsky, receiving a Doctor of Musical Arts from Columbia University in 1974. In 1988, he became the first American to win the University of Louisville Grawemeyer Award for musical composition. Additionally, he received the Kennedy Center Friedheim Award, as well as awards from The American Academy of Arts and Letters, Asia Foundation, Asian Cultural Council, Rockefeller Foundation, Ford Foundation, Guggenheim Foundation, Joyce Foundation, and The National Endowment for the Arts.

In October 2007 the Del Sol String Quartet was invited to premiere the composer's Spiral X playing the Library of Congress' collection of Stradivarius instruments.

Ung taught music at Northern Illinois University, Connecticut College, the University of Pennsylvania, and Arizona State University, before being appointed to the faculty at the University of California, San Diego. In 2013, UC San Diego promoted Ung to the rank of Distinguished Professor. 

Ung's music is published by C. F. Peters Corporation and his music is recorded on New World Records, Bridge Records, Cambria, London Records, Other Minds, Oodiscs, Nami Records, Kojima Records, Albany Records, Norton Recordings, Composers Recording Incorporated, Folkways Records, and Koch International.

Awards 
University of Louisville Grawemeyer Award for Music Composition (1989) for Inner Voices
Friedheim Award (1989) for Spiral
American Academy and Institute of Arts and Letters (1981, 1988)
John D. Rockefeller 3rd Award from the Asian Cultural Council (2014)
American Academy of Arts and Letters (2020)

Selected list of works 
1970 – Tall Wind, for soprano and chamber ensemble
1974 – Mohori, for soprano and chamber ensemble
1980 – Khse Buon, for solo cello or viola
1985 – Child Song, for alto flute, viola, harp
1986 – Inner Voices, for orchestra
1987 – Spiral, for cello, piano, and percussion
1989 – Spiral II, for soprano, tuba, and piano
1990 – Grand Spiral: Desert Flowers Bloom, for symphonic band
1992 – Spiral VI, for clarinet, violin, cello, and piano
1995 – Antiphonal Spirals, for orchestra
1997 – Seven Mirrors, for solo piano

References

External links
Profile at Columbia
Profile at UCSD
The Ensemble Sospeso

1942 births
Living people
21st-century classical composers
Cambodian composers
Cambodian expatriates in the United States
University of California, San Diego faculty
People from Takéo province
Male classical composers
21st-century male musicians